Knattspyrnufélagið Hörður, commonly known as Hörður or Hörður Ísafjörður, is an Icelandic multi-sport club from the town of Ísafjörður. It was founded in 1919 as a football club but since 1933 it has fielded other departments, most prominently in handball, track & field, skiing and Icelandic wrestling.

History
Knattspyrnufélagið Hörður was founded on 27 May 1919 as a football club with Þórhallur Leósson being its first chairman. Its first official game was against Fótboltafélag Ísafjarðar on 17 June 1921. In 1933 it started a department in women's Handball and in 1937 a track & field department. At its peak in the 1940s it was the largest sports club in the Westfjords.

Football

Recent history
After not fielding a senior team since 1940, Hörður sent a men's team to the 4. deild karla in 2014 where it finished 4th in A-group. On 1 June 2017, it defeated Snæfell/UDN 14–1 on Olísvöllurinn in Ísafjörður. On 3 June 2018, the team mounted an improbable comeback victory against Hvíti Riddarinn by scoring three goals in the last two minutes of the match, winning 6–5.

Seasons

Appearances
Competitive matches only since 2014. Correct as of 19 March 2023.

Goalscorers
Competitive matches only since 2014. Correct as of 19 March 2023.

Former notable players
Players who have played for Knattspyrnufélagið Hörður and earned caps in Besta-deild karla. Correct as of 21 July 2022.

Retired numbers

21 –  Dagur Elí Ragnarsson, Midfielder (2015–) – Number will be retired when Ragnarsson hangs his boots after years of loyalty and selfless work on and off the pitch.

Kit

Handball

Hörður has periodically fielded a men's handball team during its history. In February 2020, Þór Akureyri demanded that Hörður would pay 400.000 ISK in travel expense of Þór's trip to Ísafjörður for their September game in the Icelandic Cup. In the Cup, teams split all the income and cost of games, including travel expense of the away team, and Þór stated that their total travel expense was 800.000 ISK. The board of Hörður strongly objected as its own travel expense to Akureyri in January where they faced Þór's reserve team had not exceeded 120.000 ISK. Two days later, the clubs reached an undisclosed settlement and the Icelandic Handball Association announced it would review its rules regarding the settlement of cup games.

Although it finished last in the third-tier 2. deild karla in 2019–20, Hörður was offered a seat in the second tier 1. deild karla for the 2020–21 season where they finished in 8th place.

In July 2021, the club signed Japanese national team player and Olympian Kenya Kasahara. On 8 April 2022 the team won the second-tier 1. deild karla and achieved promotion to the top-tier Úrvalsdeild karla for the first time in its history.

Honours
1. deild karla (2022)

Notable players

  Kenya Kasahara
  Guntis Pilpuks
  Alexander Tatarintsev

References

External links
Team profile at ksi.is

Football clubs in Iceland
Association football clubs established in 1919
1919 establishments in Iceland